Lesotho competed at the 2004 Summer Paralympics in Athens, Greece. In their second Paralympic Games, they were represented by 2 sportspeople, neither of whom medaled.

Sports

Athletics

Men's track

Women's track

See also
Lesotho at the Paralympics
Lesotho at the 2004 Summer Olympics

References 

Nations at the 2004 Summer Paralympics
2004
Summer Paralympics